The 42nd Rifle Corps was a corps of the Soviet Red Army. It was part of the 14th Army. It took part in the Great Patriotic War. Its initial commander was Major General Roman Ivanovich Panin. The corps was disbanded on 14 October 1941. 

The Corps Was formed a second time in May 1943 in the Moscow Military District. 
The 399th Rifle Division was part of the 42nd Rifle Corps, 48th Army of the 3rd Belorussian Front In Germany in May 1945. The division was disbanded in August 1945, under the command of Lieutenant Colonel Shopovalov after Kazakevich left the division on 7 July 1945.

Organization 
 104th Rifle Division
 122nd Rifle Division

Commanders 
 Major General Roman Ivanovich Panin ( 14.03.1941 - 23.08.1941), 
 Major General Stepan Ilyich Morozov (24.08.1941 - 14.10.1941),
 Major General, from 29.10.1943 - Lieutenant General Konstantin Stepanovich Kolganov, (01.06.1943 - 09.05.1945)

References

Citations

Bibliography 

 

Rifle corps of the Soviet Union